St Matthew's Catholic School is a Catholic school located in Lewis Street, Mudgee, New South Wales, Australia teaching from Kindergarten to Year 12.

History
A Catholic school was first established in Mudgee in the 19th century. Leading Australian author Henry Lawson studied there for a time but struggled to find friends due to deafness and left school early.

A new school in Mudgee south was finished in April 1912. The same week tenders were called for a new Catholic School.

July 1914 saw tenders called for a new high school building completed in 1916.

In 1992, part of the school was burnt down by vandals. A new school was rebuilt on the site. The school currently has approximately 600 students in attendance.

As of the end of the 2008 school year, a new secondary building has been confirmed and will go from years 7-12.

References

Catholic primary schools in New South Wales
Roman Catholic Diocese of Bathurst in Australia
Mudgee, New South Wales
Catholic secondary schools in New South Wales